Shusmita Anis sings Nazrul Sangeet & Modern Bengali songs covering a wide variety of genres of music including light classical. She is the niece and disciple of renowned Nazrul Sangeet Artist Firoza Begum.

Early life
Shusmita Anis started her training in music from the age of five from her aunt. She specializes in Nazrul's songs and modern Bengali songs, especially songs those are tuned by her uncle and husband of Feroza Begum, Kamal Dasgupta. From an early age, Shusmita Anis has been performing regularly in state owned national broadcasting corporation, Bangladesh Television (BTV). She won the first prize in Nazrul Sangeet in 1976 in the annual national competition on performing arts, Notun Kuri , produced by BTV.

Singing career
Firoza Begum directed Shusmita Anis' first three albums. Shusmita Anis' first album of modern Bengali songs, A tribute to Kamal Das Gupta, was released in 1998 by Raga Music, Kolkata, India. In 2006, HMV in Kolkata, India, released her second album of Nazrul Sangeet, Chand Herichey Chand Mukh Tar.

Agniveena, a record company in Bangladesh, released her third album, Sei Gaan Sei Sur, in 2007. This is an album of modern Bengali songs. In 2008, Gaanchill Music, a record company in Bangladesh, released her fourth album of original Bengali songs, Ichche Nupur. Lyricist Asif Iqbal contributed to the album, while music composition of two of the songs of the album was composed by Bangladeshi singers, Nakib Khan and Kumar Bishwajit.

Her fifth album titled, Shishirer Sporshe Gatha / Sound of Seasons, was released in August 2015 by New Music Paradigm Company. Shusmita Anis dedicated the album to her aunt. The album was released both in Bangladesh and in West Bengal, India. Composer Ibrar Tipu was the music director of this album. The making of the album was supervised by tabla player, Syed Meher Hossain, son of Ustad Zakir Hussain.

Shusmita Anis conceptualized and designed the album cover art while RED Dot Multimedia Ltd. and eMusic made the music videos of many of the songs of the album.

On 9 September 2015, commemorating the first anniversary of Firoza Begum's death, Shusmita Anis published an online Extended Play (EP) titled, Mémoire Firoza Begum. The EP consists of original renditions of three songs, tuned by Firoza Begum.

Shusmita Anis has performed in several solo television programs, nationally and internationally, including Tara Music, BTV, Channel i, NTV, and ETV She performs regularly on the national Radio Bangladesh and radio stations like Radio Aamar, Radio Today. She has performed several international tours across the US, India and Bangladesh. Her recent Modern Bengali songs like "E Pran Amar Bangladesh", "Keo Januk Ar Nai Januk", "Tomar Akash" which has done well amongst the youth as it is available on her YouTube channel. Shusmita Anis continues to perform with equal popularity in Nazrul Sangeet as well as Bengali Modern songs nationally and internationally.

Feroza Begum Archive
To commemorate the first anniversary of Feroza Begum's death, her life and her works, on 9 September 2015, Shusmita Anis launched the Feroza Begum Archive. Fans have been preserving Begum's works, and recordings of her music and speech, including live performances, amongst other memorabilia. These collections have been released as downloads on Anis' website.

Musicography
Albums

Modern Bengali Song – A Tribute to Kamal Das Gupta

Chad Heriche Chad Mukh Tar

Sei Gaan Sei Sur

Icche Nupur

Shishirer Sporshe Gatha – Sound of Season

Esho He Shojol Shyam Ghono Deya

Extended play

Singles

Music videos

References

External links
 

Bangladeshi composers
21st-century Bangladeshi women singers
21st-century Bangladeshi singers
Living people
Year of birth missing (living people)
People from Dhaka District
20th-century Bangladeshi women singers
20th-century Bangladeshi singers